"Finished Symphony" is a song by the British electronic music group Hybrid. It is the first single from their debut album Wide Angle. The track's popularity has increased since its release, and it has been used in various chillout collections, including the Ibiza series. The song has also been used in BBC's TV series Top Gear, most notably during Season 7 Episode 5 which featured the Bugatti Veyron. There are two versions of the single, the UK version and Australia & Hong Kong version.

All orchestral parts of the song are performed by the Russian Federal Orchestra.

Track listing

UK
 "Finished Symphony" (Original Radio Edit) - 3:29
 "Finished Symphony" (Hybrid's Echoplex Mix Radio Edit) - 3:23
 "Finished Symphony" - 9:34
 "Finished Symphony" (Hybrid's Soundtrack Edit) - 3:21

Australia & Hong Kong
 "Finished Symphony" (Original Radio Edit) - 3:26
 "Finished Symphony" (Hybrid Echoplex Mix Radio Edit) - 3:21
 "Finished Symphony" - 9:31
 "Finished Symphony" (Hybrid Soundtrack Edit) - 3:19
 "Finished Symphony" (Hybrid Echoplex Remix) - 9:06
 "Finished Symphony" (Hybrid Soundtrack Mix) - 6:13

Official Versions
 "Finished Symphony" (Original Radio Edit) - 3:26
 "Finished Symphony" (Hybrid Echoplex Mix Radio Edit) - 3:21
 "Finished Symphony" - 9:31
 "Finished Symphony" (Hybrid Echoplex Remix) - 9:06
 "Finished Symphony" (Hybrid Soundtrack Edit) - 3:19
 "Finished Symphony" (Hybrid Soundtrack Mix) - 6:13
 "Finished Symphony" (Live Set) - 11:32

Charts

Trivia
 "Finished Symphony" is a remix of the song "Symphony", which was created by Hybrid a few years prior to Wide Angle.
 "Finished Symphony" was used in the video games SSX and SSX Tricky and was included in the latter game's soundtrack.
 "Finished Symphony" was used by BBC One and BBC Two for their coverage of live boxing events and highlights shows.
 "Finished Symphony" was remixed by Canadian electronic music producer deadmau5 for Re_Mixed in 2007.

References

1999 singles
Hybrid (British band) songs
1999 songs